Vasily Eduardovich Petrenko (born 7 July 1976) is a Russian-British conductor.  He is currently chief conductor of the European Union Youth Orchestra, music director of the Royal Philharmonic Orchestra, and principal conductor of the State Academic Symphony Orchestra of the Russian Federation.

Biography
Petrenko was born in Leningrad, USSR. He attended the Capella Boys Music School and the St Petersburg Conservatoire. Petrenko studied conducting principally under Ravil Martynov, also learning from Mariss Jansons, Yuri Temirkanov, Esa-Pekka Salonen, George Benjamin and Roberto Carnevale. He was resident conductor at the St. Petersburg Opera and Ballet Theatre from 1994 to 1997. He has served as chief conductor of the State Academy of St Petersburg since 1994. In 2002 he won the first prize of the Cadaqués Orchestra International Conducting Competition.

Petrenko made his conducting debut with the Royal Liverpool Philharmonic Orchestra (RLPO) in November 2004. After this appearance, in July 2005, he was named the RLPO's principal conductor, the youngest-ever conductor in the post, effective with the 2006–2007 season for an initial contract of 3 years. Since taking up the post, the orchestra's financial situation and attendance have improved. He has also received critical praise for revitalising the orchestra, in Russian repertoire (especially Shostakovich)  as well as standard repertoire such as Brahms, and in English music. In May 2007, the RLPO announced that Petrenko had extended his contract with the orchestra to 2012. In September 2009, the orchestra announced a further extension of his contract to 2015, with a change of Petrenko's title to Chief Conductor. In March 2013, the RLPO announced the conversion of Petrenko's contract into an extended open-ended agreement with no specific scheduled time of conclusion, and where Petrenko is to give an advance notice of 3 years of when he wishes to conclude his tenure. His first conducting appearance at The Proms was with the RLPO in August 2008. Petrenko and the RLPO have recorded several compact discs for Naxos. Petrenko's recording of Tchaikovsky's Manfred Symphony won the Gramophone orchestral recording of the year in 2009.

In April 2007, Petrenko was one of eight conductors of British orchestras to endorse the 10-year classical music outreach manifesto, "Building on Excellence: Orchestras for the 21st Century", to increase the presence of classical music in the UK, including giving free entry to all British schoolchildren to a classical music concert. From December 2008 to 2013 Petrenko served as Principal Conductor of the National Youth Orchestra of Great Britain, conducting his first concert with them at the 2009 BBC Proms.

Petrenko first conducted the Oslo Philharmonic Orchestra in December 2009. In February 2011, the Oslo Philharmonic announced the appointment of Petrenko as its next chief conductor, as of the 2013-2014 season, with an initial contract of 4 years. His initial Oslo contract called for 7 weeks of appearances in his first seasons and 10 weeks of appearances in subsequent seasons.

In August 2013, comments attributed to Petrenko in a Norwegian newspaper that appeared to denigrate female conductors caused controversy, including calls for his resignation from the RLPO.  Petrenko subsequently apologised for how some people chose to construe his remarks, and stated that his comments were in specific reference to the situation for conductors in Russia, rather than female conductors in general.  He also indicated that part of the controversy was due to the fact that the interview was conducted in English, rather than Norwegian.  Petrenko also subsequently stated publicly:

 "I'd encourage any girl to study conducting. How successful they turn out to be depends on their talent and their work, definitely not their gender."

In November 2015, Petrenko's Oslo contract was extended through 2020.  In October 2019, the orchestra announced the scheduled conclusion of Petrenko's Oslo tenure at the close of the 2019-2020 season.

Petrenko first guest-conducted the Royal Philharmonic Orchestra (RPO) in March 2016.  He returned for a subsequent guest-conducting engagement in April 2017.  In July 2018, the RPO announced the appointment Petrenko as its new music director, effective with the 2021-2022 season, with an initial contract of 5 years.  He is to hold the title of music director-designate for the 2020-2021 season.  In parallel with this RPO announcement, Petrenko is scheduled to stand down as chief conductor of the Oslo Philharmonic at the close of the 2019-2020 season.  Simultaneously with the RPO announcement, the RLPO announced that Petrenko is to conclude his RLPO chief conductorship at the close of the 2020-2021 season, and subsequently to take the title of conductor laureate with the RLPO.

Petrenko became principal guest conductor of the State Academic Symphony Orchestra of the Russian Federation in 2016.  In January 2021, the orchestra announced the appointment of Petrenko as its next principal conductor, effective 1 September 2021. In response to the 2022 Russian invasion of Ukraine, Petrenko suspended his work with the orchestra stating "In response to these terrible events, I have decided to suspend my work in Russia... until peace has been restored."

Personal life
Petrenko lives on the Wirral Peninsula with his wife, Evgenia Chernysheva-Petrenko, who is herself a conductor, and their two children, Alexander (Sasha) and Anya. He is a football aficionado and follower of the club FC Zenit Saint Petersburg and Liverpool F.C.  In March 2009, Petrenko was awarded an honorary professorship and Doctor of Letters degree from Liverpool Hope University. In April 2009, Petrenko was made an 'Honorary Scouser' by the Lord Mayor of Liverpool.  In November 2016, the city of Liverpool made Petrenko a new Citizen of Honour. He became a British citizen in 2015.

Discography
Avie Records
 Tchaikovsky: Ballet Music (from Swan Lake, The Sleeping Beauty, and The Nutcracker) (2008)
 Rachmaninov: Piano Concertos Nos. 1–4, Rhapsody on a Theme of Paganini; Simon Trpčeski, piano (2010, 2011)

Deutsche Grammophon (DG)
 Jennifer Higdon, Tchaikovsky: Violin Concertos; Hilary Hahn, violin (2010)

EMI Classics
 Tavener: Requiem (2009)
 Rachmaninov: Symphonic Dances / The Isle of the Dead / The Rock (2011)
 Rachmaninov: Symphony No. 2, Dances from Aleko (2012)
 Rachmaninov: Symphony No. 3, Caprice Bohemien, Vocalise. (2012)
 Rachmaninov: Symphony No. 1, Prince Rostislav (2013)

Ecstatic Records
 Torke: Concerto for Orchestra (2014)

LAWO Classics
 Scriabin: Symphonies Nos. 3 & 4 Le Poème de l'extase (2015)
 Prokofiev: Romeo and Juliet (2016)

Liverpool Philharmonic
 Offenbach: Un Mari à la porte (2008)

LPO Classics]
 Tchaikovsky: Violin Concerto (2017)

Mercury Classics
 Horner: Pas de Deux (2015)

Naxos Records
 Liszt: Piano Concertos Nos. 1 & 2, Totentanz (2008)
 Tchaikovsky: Manfred Symphony / The Voyevoda (2008)
 Shostakovich: Symphony No. 11 (2009)
 Shostakovich: Symphonies Nos. 5 & 9 (2009)
 Shostakovich: Symphony No. 10 (2010)
 Shostakovich: Symphony No. 8 (2010)
 Shostakovich: Symphonies Nos. 6 & 12 (2011)
 Shostakovich: Symphonies Nos. 1 & 3 (2011)
 Shostakovich: Symphonies Nos. 2 & 15 (2012)
 Shostakovich: Symphony No. 7 (2013)
 Shostakovich: Symphony No. 4 (2013)
 Shostakovich: Symphony No. 14 (2014)
 Shostakovich: Symphony No. 13 (2014)
 Shostakovich: The Complete Symphonies (2015)
 Shostakovich: Piano Concertos Nos. 1 & 2; Boris Giltburg, piano (2017)
 Beethoven: Piano Concertos Nos. 1 & 2 ;  Boris Giltburg, piano (2019)
 Beethoven: Piano Concertos Nos. 5 'Emperor'; Boris Giltburg, piano (2022)

Ondine Records
 Shostakovich: Cello Concertos Nos. 1 & 2; Truls Mørk, cello (2016)

Onyx Records
 Tchaikovsky: Piano Concertos Nos. 1 & 2; Simon Trpčeski, piano (2014)
 Elgar: Symphony No. 1, Cockaigne Overture (2015)
 Tchaikovsky: Symphony Nos. 1, 2, and 5 (2016)
 Elgar: Symphony No. 2, Carissima, Mina, Chanson de Nuit and Chanson de Matin (2017)
 Tchaikovsky: Symphony Nos. 3, 4, and 6, Pathetique (2017)
 Prokofiev: Piano Concertos Nos. 1 & 3, Overture on Hebrew Themes; Simon Trpčeski, piano (2017)

Orfeo Records
 Szymanowski: Violin Concertos Nos. 1 & 2; Baiba Skride, violin (2016)

PENTATONE
 Prokofiev: Violin Concertos Nos. 1 & 2; Arabella Steinbacher, violin (2012)

Rubicon
 Wolf-Ferrari: I Quatro Rusteghi (2018)

Sony Classical
 Guinovart: Piano Concertos Nos. 1 & 2, Valses Poéticos; Albert Guinovart, piano (2014)

Tritó Records
 Albéniz: 'Poèmes d'amour' (2013)

Warner Classics
 Tchaikovsky: Piano Concertos No. 1.  Liszt: Les Jeux d'eaux à la Villa d'Este, Sonetto 104 del Petrarca, Réminiscences de Don Juan.  George Li, piano.  LPO (2019)

References

External links
 IMG Artists biography of Vasily Petrenko
 RLPO biography of Petrenko

1976 births
Living people
Saint Petersburg Conservatory alumni
Russian expatriates in the United Kingdom
Musicians from Saint Petersburg
Musicians from Liverpool
21st-century Russian conductors (music)
Russian male conductors (music)
21st-century Russian male musicians
People from the Metropolitan Borough of Wirral